A Girl with Guitar is 1958 Soviet musical comedy film directed by Alexander Feinzimmer.

After the success of the film Carnival Night starring Lyudmila Gurchenko the script of the film A Girl with a Guitar was written counting on her popularity.

The film was shot on the eve of the 6th World Festival of Youth and Students, held in Moscow in the summer of 1957, and became the first Soviet feature film dedicated to this significant event.  The film premiered on September 1, 1958.

The film was a success with the audience. At the end of the year, А Girl with Guitar took the tenth place in the attendance rating, gathering over 31.9 million viewers, although it could not repeat the success of Carnival Night.

Plot 
Pretty salesgirl of the music store Tanya Fedosova (Lyudmila Gurchenko) dreams of becoming an actress. She often sings. There are always a lot of customers around her. But they annoy the shop director (Mikhail Zharov), who is afraid of losing a valuable employee. He tries to prevent the possible career of Tanya, who has all the data to become an actress. Acquaintance of the girl with the young composer (Vladimir Gusev) helps her dream to come true.

Cast
According to kino-teatr.ru:
 Lyudmila Gurchenko as Tanya Fedosova
 Mikhail Zharov as Arkady Sviristinsky
 Vladimir Gusev as composer Korzikov
 Faina Ranevskaya as Zoya Sviristinskaya
 Yuri Nikulin as pyrotechnic
 Sergey Blinnikov as Vasily Fedosov, Tanya's father
 Boris Petker as Apollon Starobarabantsev
 Oleg Anofriev as Vanya Savushkin
 Larisa Kronberg as cashier
 Sergey Filippov as Mamin
 Boris Novikov as Tsyplakov
 Mikhail Pugovkin as Penkin
 Sergey Golovanov as Kolosov, Chairman of the jury
 Svetlana Kharitonova as customer
 Georgy Vitsin as buyer
 Evgeny Kudryashev as the contestant who told the fable
 Valentin Bryleev as buyer (uncredited)
 Gigi Marga as singer from Bucharest (uncredited)
 Zinaida Sorochinskaya as shopper (uncredited)

Critical reception 
Official Soviet criticism met the film with hostility: "Another Girl", "To the light genre by the… easy way",  "Dangerous roll", "In captivity of bad taste" said headlines of Soviet newspapers. Gurchenko gained a reputation the actress of the lung and musical genre.

This film was the debut for Yuri Nikulin. He performed episodic role of the unlucky pyrotechnics so vividly that both the spectators and the directors immediately turned their attention to the novice actor.

Ronald Bergan, writing for The Guardian, described the film as "bouncy, colour musical full of spectacular numbers, in which Gurchenko plays a pretty young clerk in a Moscow music shop, who sings several songs enchantingly".

References

External links 

Soviet musical comedy films
1958 musical comedy films
1958 films
Mosfilm films